Corby Business Academy is a non-selective, co-educational state-funded secondary school in Corby, Northamptonshire, for the ages of 11–18 years. It is one of a group of Academy schools run by Brooke Weston Trust. The Corby-based school also operates a sixth form for students 16–19.

References

External links
 
 OFSTED Inspection Report

Academies in North Northamptonshire
Secondary schools in North Northamptonshire
Educational institutions established in 2008
2008 establishments in England